Blood and Sand is a 1941 American romantic Technicolor film starring Tyrone Power, Linda Darnell, Rita Hayworth, and Nazimova. Directed by Rouben Mamoulian, it was produced by 20th Century Fox and was based on the 1908 Spanish novel, which was critical of bullfighting, Blood and Sand (Sangre y arena), by Vicente Blasco Ibanez. The supporting cast features Anthony Quinn, Lynn Bari, Laird Cregar, J. Carrol Naish, John Carradine and George Reeves. Rita Hayworth's singing voice was dubbed by Gracilla Pirraga.

The film has two versions of Blood and Sand: a 1922 version produced by Paramount Pictures and starring Rudolph Valentino; as well as a 1916 version filmed by Blasco Ibanez with the help of Max André; in addition to a later 1989 version starring Christopher Rydell and Sharon Stone. This was the fourth and last in which Tyrone Power and Linda Darnell worked together. The others were Day-Time Wife (1939), Brigham Young (1940), and The Mark of Zorro (1940).

Plot 
As a child, Juan Gallardo (Rex Downing) wants only to become a bullfighter like his dead father. One night he has an argument with the pompous critic Natalio Curro (Laird Cregar), who criticized Juan's father's lack of talent in the bullring. The argument spurs Juan to travel to Madrid and achieve his dream of success in the bullring. Before leaving, he promises his aristocratic child sweetheart Carmen Espinosa (Ann Todd) he will return when he is a success and marry her.

Ten years later, Juan Gallardo (now played by Tyrone Power) returns to Seville. He has become a matador and uses his winnings to help his impoverished family. He sets his mother (Nazimova) up in a fine house and enables her to give up her work as a scrubwoman. He also lavishes money on his sister Encarnacion (Lynn Bari) and her fiancé Antonio (William Montague) so they can open a business and wed. He hires ex-bullfighter Garabato (J. Carrol Naish), who has become a beggar, as his servant. Best of all, he is now able to marry his childhood sweetheart Carmen (Linda Darnell) as he had promised.

Juan's wealth and fame continue to grow along with his talents as a bullfighter. Eventually he becomes Spain's most acclaimed matador. Even the once scornful critic Curro now lavishes praises upon Juan and brags that it was he who discovered Juan's talent. Although Juan remains illiterate, doors open to society and he catches the eye of sultry socialite Doña Sol des Muire (Rita Hayworth) at one of his bullfights.

Juan is blinded by the attention his fame has brought and Doña Sol finds it easy to lead him astray. He soon begins to neglect his wife, family and training in favor of her privileged and decadent lifestyle. His performance in the bullring suffers from his excesses and he falls from his position as the premiere matador of Spain while his extravagant lifestyle means that he has no savings and fails to pay suppliers and employees. His manager warns Juan that he is heading for destruction but Juan refuses to accept his advice. With falling fame and income comes rejection by everyone once important to him, while Carmen leaves him after she learns of his affair. With his fame now gone, Doña Sol moves on to new up and coming matador Manolo de Palma (Anthony Quinn), Juan's childhood friend.

After losing everything, a repentant Juan begs for forgiveness and is taken back by Carmen. He promises her to leave bullfighting but wishes to have one final bullfight to prove he is still a great matador. His prayers for one last success, however, are not answered and, like his father before him, he is gored by the bull. Garabato angrily says the "beast" is the crowd, not the bull. Juan dies in the arms of Carmen as the crowd cheers for Manolo's victory over the bull. Manolo bows to the fickle crowd near the stain left in the sand by Juan's blood.

Main cast and characters

Production 

Over 30 actresses were considered for the role of Doña Sol, including Gene Tierney and Dorothy Lamour. After Carole Landis, Zanuck's original choice, refused to dye her hair red for the role, Rita Hayworth was cast. Rouben Mamoulian's sets were inspired by the works of painters El Greco, Goya and Velázquez. During shooting, he carried paint spray guns so he could alter the color of props at a moment's notice. He also painted shadows onto walls rather than changing the lighting.

The film's exterior long shots were filmed in the Plaza de Toros in Mexico City. The famous bullfighter Armillita instructed Power and other cast members and doubled as Power in some of the bullfighting sequences shot on location. Tailor Jose Dolores Perez copied two of Armillita's elaborate matador suits for the film.

Oscar "Budd" Boetticher Jr. served as a technical advisor. This was his first film. He also worked with Power on bullfighting techniques and helped dance director Geneva Sawyer to choreograph the dance between Hayworth and Anthony Quinn.

Rita Hayworth's singing voice was dubbed by Graciela Párraga.

Unlike most films at the time, Blood and Sand was not previewed, but premiered uncut at Grauman's Chinese Theatre in May 1941.

A Lux Radio Theatre version of the story, starring Power and his then-wife Annabella as Carmen, was broadcast on October 20, 1941.

Reception 
The film was a big hit and earned a profit of $662,500.

Variety praised the picture, adding: "Especially effective are the bullfight arena sequences...Power delivers a persuasive performance as Ibanez's hero while Darnell is pretty and naive as the young wife. Hayworth is excellent as the vamp and catches major attention on a par with Nazimova, who gives a corking performance as Power's mother."

On the other hand, The New York Times review (signed T.S.) was very negative: "For there is too little drama, too little blood and sand, in it. Instead the story constantly bogs down in the most atrocious romantic cliches... (There are) glimpses of a stunning romantic melodrama with somber overtones. But most of the essential cruelty of the theme is lost in pretty colors and rhetorical speeches...The better performances come in the lesser roles—Laird Cregar as an effeminate aficionado, J. Carrol Naish as a broken matador, John Carradine as a grumbling member of the quadrilla. For one enthralling moment Vicente Gomez, the musician, appears on the screen. If the film had only caught the barbaric pulse of Gomez's incomparable fingers at the guitar, there would be good cause for cheers. Instead it has been content for the most part to posture beautifully...".

Leonard Maltin gives the film three out of four stars, describing it as a "Pastel remake of Valentino's silent film about naive bullfighter who ignores true love (Darnell) for temptress (Hayworth). Slow-paced romance uplifted by Nazimova's knowing performance as Power's mother; beautiful color production earned cinematographers Ernest Palmer and Ray Rennahan Oscars."

Take-offs 
 In the same year, 1941, the Mexican comedian Cantinflas appeared in the Mexican comedy film Ni sangre ni arena ("Neither blood nor sand") a deliberate parody of this picture.
 Inspired by Blood and Sands popularity, The Three Stooges released a short titled "What's the Matador?" with no story connection except bullfighting. It was filmed in August 1941, three months after Blood and Sand was released, but did not come out until April 1942.
 Fear and Sand, an Italian comedy film of 1948 starring Totò as a hapless bullfighter, plays only with the title.

Awards 
The film won an Academy Award for Best Cinematography. It also was nominated for Best Art Direction (Richard Day, Joseph C. Wright and Thomas Little).

References

External links 
 
 
 
 
Blood and Sand album featured at the Florida Atlantic University Libraries

1941 films
American romantic drama films
1940s English-language films
Films based on Spanish novels
Films based on works by Vicente Blasco Ibáñez
20th Century Fox films
Films whose cinematographer won the Best Cinematography Academy Award
Films directed by Rouben Mamoulian
Bullfighting films
Films set in Spain
Remakes of American films
Sound film remakes of silent films
Films with screenplays by Jo Swerling
Films produced by Darryl F. Zanuck
Films scored by Alfred Newman
1941 romantic drama films
Melodrama films
1940s American films